Francesco Morosini (26 February 1619 – 16 January 1694) was the Doge of Venice from 1688 to 1694, at the height of the Great Turkish War. He was one of the many Doges and generals produced by the noble Venetian family of Morosini. He "dressed always in red from top to toe and never went into action without his cat beside him."

Early career
Morosini first rose to prominence as Captain-General of the Venetian forces on Crete during the siege of Candia by the Ottoman Empire.  He was eventually forced to surrender the city, and was accused of cowardice and treason on his return to Venice; however, he was acquitted after a brief trial.

In 1685, at the outbreak of the Morean War, Morosini took command of a fleet against the Ottomans. Over the next several years, he captured the Morea with the help of Otto Wilhelm Königsmarck, as well as Lefkada and parts of western Greece. He also briefly captured Athens but was unable to hold it, and attempted a failed siege of the former Venetian fortress of Negroponte. His fame reached such heights that he was given the victory title Peloponnesiacus, and was the first Venetian citizen to have a bronze bust placed during his own lifetime in the Great Hall, with the inscription Francisco Morosini Peloponnesiaco, adhuc viventi, Senatus.

Destruction of the Parthenon and loot of sculptures from Athens

During the Morean War the Parthenon was used as a gunpowder magazine by the Ottoman Army. On September 26, 1687, Venetian mortars bombarding Athens scored a direct hit on the edifice. An attaché of the Swedish field commander General Otto Wilhelm Königsmarck wrote later: "How it dismayed His Excellency to destroy the beautiful temple which had existed three thousand years!". By contrast Morosini, who was the commander in chief of the operation, described it in his report to the Venetian government as a "fortunate shot".

When he conquered the Acropolis in early 1688, Morosini attempted to loot Athena's and Poseidon's horses and chariots from the western pediment of the Parthenon, but the sculptures fell on the ground and smashed. This was the first documented attempt to remove sculptures from the pediments.
The Ottoman Empire regained possession of the monument in the following year and, having noticed the damage, began to sell souvenirs to Westerners.

Morosini also took the Piraeus Lion as a war trophy to the Venetian Arsenal.

Doge
In the summer of 1688, Morosini, now having been proclaimed Doge of Venice, attacked Negropont but was unable to capture it and was forced to return to Venice when plague broke out among his troops. He embarked on a final campaign in 1693, but was again unsuccessful in taking Negropont, and returned to Venice after sacking some minor coastal towns. After his death in 1694, a large marble arch was placed in his honor at the Doge's Palace. Nini, the cat of which Morosini was notably fond of, was embalmed along with a mouse between her paws. Nini and the mouse are current exhibits at the Museo Correr in Venice.

Commemoration

 The Scuola Navale Militare Francesco Morosini is named for him.
 The  , launched on 30 July 1885, completed in 1889, and stricken in 1909, was named for him.
 The  Francesco Morosini, laid down in 1915 but scrapped in 1921 prior to launching, was named for him.

References

See also
 Parthenon
 Elgin Marbles

Republic of Venice generals
1619 births
1694 deaths
Francesco
People of the Great Turkish War
People acquitted of treason
Ottoman Athens
Ottoman Peloponnese
Republic of Venice people of the Ottoman–Venetian Wars
Cretan War (1645–1669)
17th-century Italian nobility
17th-century Doges of Venice
Dukes of Crete